South Dakota Highway 1806 (SD 1806) is a state highway in the U.S. state of South Dakota. It exists in four distinct sections. Its longest section begins at SD 273 and runs along the Missouri River nearly its whole length, serving Pierre. SD 1806 along with SD 1804 are numbered from the years of the Lewis and Clark Expedition.

Route description

Gregory County

Southern segment

Northern segment

Lyman and Stanley Counties
SD 1806 begins at the northern terminus of SD 273 in Lyman County and begins heading northwest. The route remains a two lane road and follows the Missouri River, heading towards Pierre. As it nears Pierre, the route becomes concurrent with US 83 and enters Fort Pierre. At the north end of Fort Pierre, US 83 becomes concurrent with US 14 heading east while SD 1806 splits from US 83 and becomes concurrent with US 14 and SD 34 for nearly a mile, heading west from the Deadwood Street and Yellowstone Street intersection. After one mile of concurrency, SD 1806 splits from US 14/SD 34 and heads north, passing by the Fort Pierre Chouteau National Historic Landmark and remaining parallel with the Missouri River. It then passes by Lake Oahe, intersecting the west end of SD 204 which passes over the Oahe Dam. SD 1806 continues west and remains parallel with the Missouri River until reaching Sansarc Road. The route continues northwest and ends at an intersection with Minneconjou Road south of Mission Ridge.

Corson County

History
A portion of SD 1806 near Lake Oahe was numbered as SD 514. It was later redesignated into parts of SD 1804, SD 204, and part of today's portion of SD 1806.

Major intersections

Wakpala spur

Although unsigned, it provides access to the town of Wakpala, South Dakota, located in the Standing Rock Indian Reservation.

See also

References

External links

1806
Transportation in Gregory County, South Dakota
Transportation in Lyman County, South Dakota
Transportation in Stanley County, South Dakota
Transportation in Corson County, South Dakota